Long Beach is a city in Los Angeles County, California. It is the 42nd-most populous city in the United States, with a population of 466,742 as of 2020. A charter city, Long Beach is the seventh-most populous city in California.

Incorporated in 1897, Long Beach lies in Southern California in the southern part of Los Angeles County. The Port of Long Beach is the second busiest container port in the United States and is among the world's largest shipping ports. The city is over an oilfield with minor wells both directly beneath the city as well as offshore.

The city is known for its waterfront attractions, including the permanently docked  and the Aquarium of the Pacific. Long Beach also hosts the Grand Prix of Long Beach, an IndyCar race and the Long Beach Pride Festival and Parade. California State University, Long Beach, one of the largest universities in California by enrollment, is within the city.

History

Tongva period

Indigenous people have lived in coastal Southern California for over 10,000 years, and several successive cultures have inhabited the present-day area of Long Beach. By the 16th-century arrival of Spanish explorers, the dominant group was the Tongva, who had established at least three major settlements within the present-day city. Tevaaxa'anga was an inland settlement near the Los Angeles River, while Ahwaanga and Povuu'nga were coastal villages. Povuu'nga was particularly important to the Tongva, not only as a regional trading center and hub for fishermen, but for its deep ceremonial significance, being understood as their place of emergence as a people from which their lives began.

Spanish and Mexican period

In 1784, the Spanish Empire's King Carlos III granted Rancho Los Nietos to Spanish soldier Manuel Nieto. The Rancho Los Cerritos and Rancho Los Alamitos were divided from this territory. The boundary between the two ranchos ran through the center of Signal Hill on a southwest to northeast diagonal. A portion of western Long Beach was originally part of the Rancho San Pedro. Its boundaries were in dispute for years, due to flooding changing the Los Angeles River boundary between Rancho San Pedro and Rancho Los Nietos.

By 1805, what had been the major Tongva village of Puvunga was thoroughly depleted of villagers, most of whom were brought to Mission San Gabriel for conversion and as a labor force. Many villagers died at the mission, which had a high rate of death, particularly among children, attributed to many factors like diseases that spread quickly in the close quarters of the mission's walls, as well as torture, malnourishment, and overworking.

In 1843, Juan Temple bought Rancho Los Cerritos, having arrived in California in 1827 from New England. He built what is now known as the "Los Cerritos Ranch House", a still-standing adobe which is a National Historic Landmark. Temple created a thriving cattle ranch and prospered, becoming the wealthiest man in Los Angeles County. Both Temple and his ranch house played important local roles in the Mexican–American War. On an island in the San Pedro Bay, Mormon pioneers made an abortive attempt to establish a colony (as part of Brigham Young's plan to establish a continuous chain of settlements from the Pacific to Salt Lake).

Post-Conquest period

Following the U.S. Conquest of California, Temple had his Rancho Los Cerritos deeded to him by the Public Land Commission. In 1866, Temple sold Rancho Los Cerritos for $20,000 to the Northern California sheep-raising firm of Flint, Bixby & Company, which consisted of brothers Thomas and Benjamin Flint and their cousin Lewellyn Bixby. Two years previous Flint, Bixby & Co had also purchased along with Northern California associate James Irvine, three ranchos which would later become the city that bears Irvine's name. To manage Rancho Los Cerritos, the company selected Lewellyn's brother Jotham Bixby, the "Father of Long Beach". Three years later, Bixby bought into the property and would later form the Bixby Land Company. In the 1870s, as many as 30,000 sheep were kept at the ranch and sheared twice yearly to provide wool for trade. In 1880, Bixby sold  of the Rancho Los Cerritos to William E. Willmore, who subdivided it in hopes of creating a farm community, Willmore City. He failed and was bought out by a Los Angeles syndicate that called itself the "Long Beach Land and Water Company". They changed the name of the community to Long Beach at that time.

Incorporation

The City of Long Beach was officially incorporated in 1897. The town grew as a seaside resort with light agricultural uses. The Pike was the most famous beachside amusement zone on the West Coast from 1902 until 1969; it offered bathers food, games and rides, such at the Sky Wheel dual Ferris wheel and Cyclone Racer roller coaster. Gradually the oil industry, Navy shipyard and facilities and port became the mainstays of the city. In the 1950s it was referred to as "Iowa by the sea", due to a large influx of people from that and other Midwestern states. Huge picnics for migrants from each state were a popular annual event in Long Beach until the 1960s.

Another Bixby cousin, John W. Bixby, was influential in the city. After first working for his cousins at Los Cerritos, J.W. Bixby leased land at Rancho Los Alamitos. He put together a group: banker I.W. Hellman, Lewellyn and Jotham Bixby, and him, to purchase the rancho. In addition to bringing innovative farming methods to the Alamitos (which under Abel Stearns in the late 1850s and early 1860s was once the largest cattle ranch in the US), J.W. Bixby began the development of the oceanfront property near the city's picturesque bluffs. Under the name Alamitos Land Company, J.W. Bixby named the streets and laid out the parks of his new city. This area would include Belmont Heights, Belmont Shore and Naples; it soon became a thriving community of its own. J.W. Bixby died in 1888 of apparent appendicitis. The Rancho Los Alamitos property was split up, with Hellman getting the southern third, Jotham and Lewellyn, the northern third, and J.W. Bixby's widow and heirs keeping the central third. The Alamitos townsite was kept as a separate entity, but at first, it was primarily run by Lewellyn and Jotham Bixby, although I.W, Hellman (who had the largest single share) had a significant veto power, an influence made even stronger as the J.W. Bixby heirs began to side with Hellman more and more.

When Jotham Bixby died in 1916, the remaining  of Rancho Los Cerritos was subdivided into the neighborhoods of Bixby Knolls, California Heights, Los Cerritos, North Long Beach and part of the city of Signal Hill.

Pine Avenue near 4th became the center of a large shopping district. Besides upscale Buffums (1912; expanded 1926), in 1929 alone Barker Brothers, the Hugh A. Marti Co., and Wise Company department stores built large new stores, Walker's (1933), and nearby at American and 5th, Sears (1928) and Montgomery Ward (1929). It would remain popular until suburban malls sprung up starting in the 1950s. (see also: History of Retail in Southern California)

Oil was discovered in 1921 on Signal Hill, which split off as a separately incorporated city shortly afterward. The discovery of the Long Beach Oil Field, brought in by the gusher at the Alamitos oil well #1, made Long Beach a major oil producer; in the 1920s the field was the most productive in the world. In 1932, the even larger Wilmington Oil Field, fourth-largest in the United States, and which is mostly in Long Beach, was developed, contributing to the city's fame in the 1930s as an oil town.

The M6.4 1933 Long Beach earthquake caused significant damage to the city and surrounding areas, killing a total of 120 people. Most of the damage occurred in unreinforced masonry buildings, especially schools. Pacific Bible Seminary (now known as Hope International University) was forced to move classes out of First Christian Church of Long Beach and into a small local home due to damage.

The Ford Motor Company built a factory called Long Beach Assembly at the then address in 1929 as "700 Henry Ford Avenue, Long Beach" where the factory began building the Ford Model A. Production of Ford vehicles continued after the war until 1960 when the plant was closed due to a fire, and January 1991 when the factory was demolished partially due to air quality remediation efforts. Ford had earlier opened a Factory in Los Angeles at the location of 12th Street and Olive, with a later factory built at East Seventh Street and Santa Fe Avenue after 1914.

Come 1938, the creation of Housing Authorities for both the City and County of Los Angeles were complete — and North Long Beach was to be home to the County Authority's first order of business: the Carmelitos Housing Project, Southern California's first affordable housing complex.

The city was part of the Battle of Los Angeles during World War II when observers for the United States Army Air Forces reported shells being fired from the sea. Anti-aircraft batteries fired into the night sky, although no planes were ever sighted.

Before the war, Long Beach had a sizable Japanese-American population, who worked in the fish canneries on Terminal Island and owned small truck (produce) farms in the area. Due to fears on the coast, state officials persuaded the national government to remove Japanese nationals and Japanese Americans for internment in 1942 to inland facilities. Most did not return to the city after their release from the camps. Due to this and other factors, Japanese Americans now make up less than 1% of the population of Long Beach, but the Japanese Community Center and a Japanese Buddhist Church survive. The Japanese-American Cultural Center is over the Gerald Desmond Bridge and the Vincent Thomas Bridge in San Pedro.

Douglas Aircraft Company's largest facility was its Long Beach plant, totaling . The first plane rolled out the door on December 23, 1941. The plant produced C-47 Skytrain transports, B-17 Flying Fortress bombers, and A-20 Havoc attack bombers simultaneously. Douglas merged with the McDonnell Aircraft Company in 1967 where the Douglas DC-8 and the McDonnell Douglas DC-9 were built. In 1997 McDonnell Douglas merged with Boeing, which made C-17 Globemaster transport planes in Long Beach until the close of the manufacturing facility in 2015.

Geography

Long Beach completely surrounds the city of Signal Hill.

Neighborhoods

Long Beach is composed of many different neighborhoods. Some neighborhoods are named after thoroughfares, while others are named for nearby parks, schools, or city features.

Climate

Long Beach has a climate that can either be described as a hot semi-arid climate or a hot-summer Mediterranean climate. In general, the city features hot summers and mild to warm winters with occasional rainfall. Days in Long Beach are mostly sunny, as in Southern California in general. During the summer months, low clouds and fog occur frequently, developing overnight and blanketing the area on many mornings. This fog usually clears by the afternoon, and a westerly sea breeze often develops, keeping temperatures mild. Heat and high humidity can sometimes coincide in summer, which may cause discomfort due to the heat index.

Long Beach's location directly east of the Palos Verdes Peninsula, paired with its south facing coastline, results in the city sometimes experiencing different weather patterns than the Los Angeles metropolitan area coastal communities to the northwest and southeast of Long Beach, which largely have west facing coastlines. The 1200 ft Palos Verdes hills block west to east airflow and a significant amount of the coastal moisture that marks other coastal cities, such as Manhattan Beach, Santa Monica, and Newport Beach.

As in most locations in Southern California, most rainfall in Long Beach occurs during the winter months. Storms can bring heavy rainfall.

Environment

Pollution

Long Beach suffers from some of the worst air pollution in the entire United States. Most of the city is in proximity to the twin ports of Los Angeles and Long Beach, and the prevailing westerly-to-west-south-westerly winds bring a large portion of the twin ports' air pollution directly into Long Beach before dispersing it northward then eastward. Heavy pollution sources at the ports include the ships themselves, which burn high-sulfur, high-soot-producing bunker fuel to maintain internal electrical power while docked, as well as heavy diesel pollution from drayage trucks at the ports, and short-haul tractor-trailer trucks ferrying cargo from the ports to inland warehousing, rail yards, and shipping centers. Long-term average levels of toxic air pollutants (and the corresponding carcinogenic risk they create) can be two to three times higher in and around Long Beach, and in downwind areas to the east, than in other parts of the Los Angeles metropolitan area, such as the Westside, San Fernando Valley, or San Gabriel Valley. While overall regional pollution in the Los Angeles metropolitan area has declined in the last decade, pollution levels remain dangerously high in much of Long Beach due to the port pollution, with diesel exhaust from ships, trains, and trucks as the largest sources.

Additionally, Long Beach is directly downwind of several of the South Bay oil refineries. Any refinery process or chemical upset that results in the atmospheric release of refinery by-products (commonly sulfur dioxide) will usually impact air quality in Long Beach due to the west-south-westerly prevailing wind.

Similarly, the water quality in the Long Beach portion of San Pedro Bay, which is enclosed by the Federal Breakwater, commonly ranks among the poorest on the entire West Coast during rainy periods. Long Beach beaches average a D or F grade on beach water quality during rainy periods in the Beach Report Card published by Heal the Bay. However, during dry periods the water may have an A or B rating in the same reports. The Los Angeles River discharges directly into the Long Beach side of San Pedro Bay, meaning a large portion of all the urban runoff from the entire Los Angeles metropolitan area pours directly into the harbor water. This runoff contains most of the debris, garbage, chemical pollutants, and biological pathogens washed into storm drains in every upstream city each time it rains. Because the breakwater prevents tidal flushing and wave action, these pollutants build up in the harbor. The water enclosed by the breakwater, along most of the city's beaches, can be subject to red tides due to this stagnation as well. Because of these factors, the water in Long Beach is sometimes unsafe for swimming, up to weeks each year.

Ecology

The area that is now Long Beach historically included several ecological communities, with coastal scrub dominating. A handful of the native plants of the region can still be found in the city. These include California buckwheat (Eriogonum fasciculatum), California sagebrush (Artemisia californica), and California poppy (Eschscholzia californica). Some stands of coast live oak (Quercus agrifolia) still remain in the El Dorado Nature Center. California fan palm (Washingtonia filifera), a plant that is native further inland, was introduced to the city as a garden ornamental and is now naturalized. Some indigenous species of birds, mammals, and other wildlife have adapted to development.

Since the arrival of Europeans, many alien species have become naturalized in the area. Introduced plants include yellow mustard, eucalyptus, wild radish, and tumbleweed. Such plants now far outnumber the indigenous plants and spread rapidly in the city's vacant lots and oil fields.

The city and its residents have initiatives underway to preserve and reclaim part of its ecological heritage. The RiverLink project has begun to revegetate the Long Beach stretch of the Los Angeles River with indigenous plants. Part of the remaining Pacific Electric right-of-way was cleared of nonnatives, planted with indigenous plants, and made accessible with foot and bike paths. This community open space is now known as The Long Beach Greenbelt and is the focus of continuing efforts in restoration and community education.

The El Dorado Nature Center has changed its original "hands-off" approach and has begun to actively introduce indigenous species. The Los Cerritos Wetlands Study Group, state government agencies, and grassroots groups are collaborating on a plan to preserve Long Beach's last remaining wetlands. Long Beach is the first city in California to join the 'EcoZone' Program, intended to measurably improve environmental conditions through public-private partnerships. Such projects seek to reduce pollution, restore native habitat, and provide green areas for the city's residents to enjoy.

Other places in Long Beach to see natural areas include Bluff Park (coastal bluffs), the Golden Shore Marine Biological Reserve, the Jack Dunster Marine Reserve, Shoreline Park, and DeForest Park.

Long Beach led Southern California in parks access, size and spending, ranking 16th among a survey of 75 large U.S. cities, with Los Angeles and Anaheim tied for 51st and Santa Ana 69th, according to a study released by a national conservation group.

Demographics

2010

The 2010 United States Census reported that Long Beach had a population of 462,257. The racial makeup of Long Beach was 213,066 (46.1%) White, 62,603 (13.5%) Black or African American, 3,458 (0.7%) Native American, 59,496 (12.9%) Asian (4.5% Filipino, 3.9% Cambodian, 0.9% Vietnamese, 0.6% Chinese, 0.6% Japanese, 0.4% Indian, 0.4% Korean, 0.2% Thai, 0.1% Laotian, 0.1% Hmong), 5,253 (1.1%) Pacific Islander (0.8% Samoan, 0.1% Guamanian, 0.1% Tongan), 93,930 (20.3%) from other races, and 24,451 (5.3%) from two or more races. Hispanic or Latino of any race were 188,412 persons (40.8%). 32.9% of the city's population was of Mexican heritage. Non-Hispanic Whites were 29.4% of the population in 2010, down from 86.2% in 1970.

The ethnic Cambodian population of approximately 20,000 is the largest outside of Asia.

The Census reported 453,980 people (98.2% of the population) lived in households, 5,321 (1.2%) lived in non-institutionalized group quarters, and 2,956 (0.6%) were institutionalized.

There were 163,531 households, out of which 58,073 (35.5%) had children under the age of 18 living in them, 61,850 (37.8%) were opposite-sex married couples living together, 26,781 (16.4%) had a female householder with no husband present, 10,598 (6.5%) had a male householder with no wife present. There were 12,106 (7.4%) unmarried opposite-sex partnerships, and 3,277 (2.0%) same-sex married couples or partnerships. Of the households, 46,536 (28.5%) were made up of individuals, and 11,775 (7.2%) had someone living alone who was 65 years of age or older. The average household size was 2.78. There were 99,229 families (60.7% of all households); the average family size was 3.52.

The age distribution of the city was as follows: 115,143 people (24.9%) were under the age of 18, 54,163 people (11.7%) aged 18 to 24, 140,910 people (30.5%) aged 25 to 44, 109,206 people (23.6%) aged 45 to 64, and 42,835 people (9.3%) who were 65 years of age or older. The median age was 33.2 years. For every 100 females, there were 96.1 males. For every 100 females age 18 and over, there were 93.8 males.

The homeowner vacancy rate was 2.0%; the rental vacancy rate was 7.2%. 195,254 people (42.2% of the population) lived in owner-occupied housing units and 258,726 people (56.0%) lived in rental housing units.

During 2009–2013, Long Beach had a median household income of $52,711, with 20.2% of the population living below the federal poverty line.

As of 2014, the population of Long Beach was 473,577.

2000

As of the census of 2000, there were 461,522 people, 163,088 households, and 99,646 families residing in the city. The population density was 9,149.8 inhabitants per square mile (3,532.8/km2). The racial makeup of the city was 45.2% White, 14.9% Black or African American (U.S. Census), 0.8% Native American, 12.1% Asian, 1.2% Pacific Islander, 20.6% from other races, and 5.3% from two or more races. Hispanic or Latino people of any race were 35.8% of the population.

The city has changed since the 1950s, when its population was predominantly European-American and the city was nicknamed "Iowa by the Sea" or "Iowa under Palm Trees" as it had a slower pace than neighboring Los Angeles. In 1950, whites represented 97.4% of Long Beach's population. Since the second half of the 20th century, the city has been a major port of entry for Asian and Latin American immigrants headed to Los Angeles. The Harbor section of downtown Long Beach was once home to people of Dutch, Greek, Italian, Maltese, Portuguese and Spanish ancestry, most of them employed in manufacturing and fish canneries until the 1960s.

According to a report by USA Today in 2000, Long Beach is the most ethnically diverse large city in the United States. Non-Hispanic White Americans made up 30.0% of the city's population. Its Asian community includes the largest Cambodian community in the United States, and the second-largest Cambodian community outside of Asia (after Paris). A neighborhood along Anaheim Street is called "Little Phnom Penh". There are also sizable populations of immigrants and descendants from Vietnam and the Philippines.

Long Beach had offered many industrial jobs to African Americans during the years of World War II. This resulted in the increase of blacks in Long Beach caused by the Second Great Migration. There are black communities in the Eastside, North Long Beach, and Upper Westside neighborhoods.

It has a relatively high proportion of Pacific Islanders (over 1% as of the 2000 Census), from Samoa and Tonga. Most American Indians, about 0.8% of the city's population, arrived during the Department of the Interior's Bureau of Indian Affairs urban relocation programs in the 1950s.

Long Beach once had a sizable Japanese American population, which largely worked in the fish canneries on Terminal Island and on small truck farms in the area. In 1942, not long after the Attack on Pearl Harbor and subsequent Japanese declaration of war on the United States and the British Empire, President Franklin D. Roosevelt issued United States Executive Order 9066 which allowed military commanders to designate areas "from which any or all persons may be excluded". Under this order, all Japanese and Americans of Japanese ancestry were categorically removed from Western coastal regions and sent to internment camps, without regard for due process. Most did not return to Long Beach after their release from the camps. Japanese Americans make up less than 1% of the population of Long Beach, yet the city still has a Japanese Community Center and a Japanese Buddhist Church from its earlier history.

As of the 2000 census, there were 163,088 households, out of which 35.0% had children under the age of 18 living with them, 39.2% were married couples living together, 16.1% had a female householder with no husband present, and 38.9% were non-families. Of all households, 29.6% were made up of individuals, and 7.4% had someone living alone who was 65 years of age or older. The average household size was 2.77 and the average family size was 3.55.

In the city, 29.2% of the population was under the age of 18, 10.9% from 18 to 24, 32.9% from 25 to 44, 18.0% from 45 to 64, and 9.1% was 65 years of age or older. The median age was 31 years. For every 100 females, there were 96.6 males. For every 100 females age 18 and over, there were 93.5 males.

The median income for a household in the city was $37,270, and the median income for a family was $40,002. Males had a median income of $36,807 versus $31,975 for females. The per capita income for the city was $19,040. About 19.3% of families and 22.8% of the population were below the poverty line, including 32.7% of those under age 18 and 11.0% of those age 65 or over. In 2008, the Census Bureau showed the number of people living below the poverty line had dropped to 18.2%.

Economy

The economic base has changed over the years. Oil extraction created a boom and continues to fund portions of the city budget. Long Beach was a Navy town for many years before the base closed. The aerospace industry played an important role. Douglas Aircraft Company (later McDonnell Douglas and now part of Boeing) had plants at the Long Beach Airport where they built aircraft for World War II, and later built DC-8s, DC-9s, DC-10s, and MD-11s. Boeing built the Boeing 717 until 2006 and the C-17 Globemaster III strategic airlifter until 2015, the plants were leased by Mercedes-Benz and Relativity Space. Even after greatly reducing the number of local employees in recent years, Boeing is still the largest private employer in the city. Polar Air Cargo, an international cargo airline, was formerly based in Long Beach. TABC, Inc., a part of Toyota, makes a variety of car parts, including steering columns and catalytic converters, in Long Beach.

Epson America, Inc. the U.S. affiliate of Japan-based Seiko Epson Corporation, is headquartered in Long Beach. Pioneer Electronics, the U.S. affiliate of Japan-based Pioneer Corporation, is also headquartered in Long Beach along with SCAN Health Plan, a non-profit "Medicare Advantage" HMO for seniors. Molina Healthcare, Inc., a Medicaid management healthcare program, is headquartered in Long Beach. The real estate company HCP is based in Long Beach. Jesse James' West Coast Choppers custom motorcycle shop was in Long Beach, and much of the Monster Garage cable TV show was shot in Long Beach. Long Beach Green Business Association is an organization working to create economic growth through the promotion of green business and promoting a buy local program for Long Beach.

The Long Beach Accelerator was founded in 2019 as a public-private partnership between the city of Long Beach, Sunstone Management, and California State University, Long Beach, with the aim of growing the presence of diverse technology entrepreneurs in the city.

Top employers

Trade valued annually at more than $140 billion moves through Long Beach, making it the second busiest seaport in the United States. The Port supports more than 30,000 jobs in Long Beach, 316,000 jobs throughout Southern California and 1.4 million jobs throughout the United States. It generates about $16 billion in annual trade-related wages statewide.

Retail
Los Altos Center is the only mall anchored by major department stores within city limits, while Lakewood Center mall is adjacent to Long Beach. Until the 1950s, Long Beach was the major retail hub between Los Angeles and Santa Ana. Buffum's, Walker's and Robert's all had their flagship stores in the city. Later the Long Beach Plaza and Marina Pacifica malls were built, since repurposed as retail power centers. The largest shopping center within the city is the Long Beach Towne Center, a power center opened in 1999 on the site of the Long Beach Naval Hospital. The Pike Outlets and 2nd & PCH are new retail centers.

Culture

Art

The Long Beach Museum of Art, sited in the historic Elizabeth Milbank Anderson residence, is owned by the City of Long Beach, and operated by the Long Beach Museum of Art Foundation. Long Beach also features the Museum of Latin American Art, founded in 1996 by Dr. Robert Gumbiner. It is the only museum in the western United States that exclusively features modern and contemporary Latin American art.

Long Beach's newest museum is The Pacific Island Ethnic Art Museum (PieAM). This museum was a project of Robert Gumbiner at the time of his death. The museum opened October 15, 2010.

In 1965, Long Beach State hosted the first International Sculpture Symposium to be held in the United States and the first at a college or university. Six sculptors from around the world and two from the United States created many of the monumental sculptures seen on the campus. There are now over 20 sculptures on the campus.

Long Beach is known for its street art. Some of the murals were created in conjunction with the city's Mural and Cultural Arts Program, but many others were not.

On the exterior of the Long Beach Sports Arena is one of the artist Wyland's Whaling Walls. At 116,000 square feet (11,000 m2), it is the world's largest mural (according to the Guinness Book of Records).

Shops and galleries in the East Village Arts District, in downtown Long Beach hold their monthly art openings and artists exhibit in street galleries on the second Saturday of the month during the Artwalk.

Long Beach has a percent for art program administered through the Arts Council of Long Beach and the Redevelopment Agency which ensures new private developments contribute to the arts fund or commission artworks for their new projects.

Music

The Bob Cole Conservatory of Music, the recently renamed school of music at CSULB, presents a wide variety of classical, jazz, and world music concerts each year. The Conservatory is part of CSULB's renowned College of the Arts.

The Long Beach Symphony plays numerous classical and pop music concerts throughout the year. The symphony plays at the Terrace Theater in the Long Beach Convention and Entertainment Center.

Long Beach Opera, founded in 1979, is the oldest professional opera company serving the Los Angeles and Orange County regions. It presents performances of standard and non-standard opera repertoire at various locations, including the Terrace Theater and Center Theater of the Long Beach Convention and Entertainment Center and the Richard and Karen Carpenter Performing Arts Center at CSULB.

Long Beach Community Concert Association is a 49-year-old volunteer organization that provides quality musical entertainment appealing to seniors and others, four Sunday afternoons a year at the Carpenter Performing Arts Center at CSULB. LBCCA also has an outreach program taking musical entertainment to senior care and senior housing facilities around the greater Long Beach area.

KJAZZ 88.1 FM (KKJZ) broadcasts from California State University, Long Beach. The station originally featured jazz and blues music exclusively but now plays a broader range of music including Rhythm and Blues (R&b). KKJZ can also be listened to over the Internet. Kbeach is the student owned and operated web-only radio at CSULB.

Long Beach City College operates two internet student-run radio stations, KCTY FM and KLBC AM.

Long Beach is the host to a number of long-running music festivals. They include the Bob Marley Reggae Festival (February), the Cajun & Zydeco Festival (May), the El Dia De San Juan Puerto Rican Festival (Salsa music, June) the Aloha Concert Jam (Hawaiian music, June), the Long Beach Jazz Festival (August), the Long Beach Blues Festival (September, since 1980), and the Brazilian Street Carnaval (Brazilian music, September).

The Long Beach Municipal Band, founded in 1909, is the longest running, municipally supported band in the country. In 2005, the band played 24 concerts in various parks around Long Beach.

Long Beach is also the point of origin for bands and musicians such as Daz Dillinger, The Pussycat Dolls, The Nitty Gritty Dirt Band, Jenni Rivera, T.S.O.L., Frank Ocean, Sublime, Snoop Dogg, Tha Mexakinz, Nate Dogg, Warren G, Tha Dogg Pound, Knoc-Turn'al, the Long Beach Dub Allstars, Avi Buffalo, Crystal Antlers, The Emperors, The Pyramids, Crooked I, Stick to Your Guns, War and Vince Staples.

Theater

Long Beach has several resident professional and semi-professional theater companies. Musical Theatre West, one of the largest regional theatrical producers in Southern California, performs at the Carpenter Performing Arts Center on the campus of CSU Long Beach. International City Theatre produces plays and musicals at the Beverly O'Neill Theatre (part of the Long Beach Convention and Entertainment Center). The Long Beach Playhouse, in continuous operation for over 75 years, has shows running 50 weeks out of the year on two stages. Long Beach Shakespeare Company for over 20 years has provided free outdoor Shakespeare Festivals in the Summer.

Additionally, Long Beach is home to a number of smaller and "black-box" theaters, including the Found Theatre, Alive Theatre, the Garage Theatre and California Repertory Company (part of the graduate theater program at CSULB) that performs at the Royal Theater aboard the Queen Mary in downtown Long Beach. Numerous tours and other stage events come through Long Beach, particularly at the Terrace Theater and the Carpenter Center, and both CSU Long Beach and Long Beach City College maintain active theater departments.

Cultural events

In October, Long Beach State hosts the CSULB Wide Screen Film Festival, at the Carpenter Performing Arts Center. The festival started in 1992 as a showcase for movies shot in the widescreen format, but has since been transformed into an artist-in-residence event. A major video and film artist (such as former CSULB student Steven Spielberg) screens and discusses their own work as well as the ten productions that most influenced their cinematic vision.

The "Naples Island Christmas Parade" has been held since 1946, and passes through the canals of Naples and around Alamitos Bay past Belmont Shore. The "Parade of A Thousand Lights" is in the Shoreline Village area (near downtown Long Beach and the ). There is also a Christmas boat parade in the nearby Port of Los Angeles/San Pedro area, and another in the Huntington Harbour community of nearby Huntington Beach.

The Long Beach Lesbian and Gay Pride Parade and Festival has been held in May or June since 1984. It is the second largest event in Long Beach, attracting over 125,000 participants over the two-day celebration. It is the third largest Gay Pride Parade in the United States.

The Long Beach Sea Festival is held during the summer months (June through August). It features events centered on the ocean and the beach. These events include beach volleyball, movies on the beach, and a tiki festival.

Sites of interest

The  is a 1936 Art Deco ocean liner permanently docked at Long Beach. It was purchased by the City of Long Beach in 1967 for conversion to a hotel and maritime museum.

The nonprofit Aquarium of the Pacific is on a  site on Rainbow Harbor in Long Beach, across the water from the Long Beach Convention Center, Shoreline Village, and the Queen Mary Hotel and Attraction.

Lions Lighthouse is a decorative lighthouse built by the Lions Club to advertise their services for the blind. It is popular for scenic viewing.

The Long Beach Department of Parks, Recreation and Marine received a Gold Medal award from the National Recreation and Park Association in 2002, 2003, and 2004, recognizing the Department's "outstanding management practices and programs". The department manages 92 parks covering over  throughout the city, including the  El Dorado Regional Park, which features fishing lakes, an archery range, youth campground, bike trails, and picnic areas. The department also operates four public swimming pools, and four launch ramps for boaters to access the Pacific Ocean.

The  El Dorado Nature Center is part of the larger El Dorado Regional Park. The center features lakes, a stream, and trails, with meadows and forested areas.

The Municipal Fly Casting Pool at Recreation Park in East Long Beach is a 260-by-135-foot clear water, fishless pond built and operated since 1925 by the Long Beach Casting Club as only one of two Southern California city operated casting ponds (the other being in Pasadena). Described recently as a serene pond "surrounded by a seemingly endless stretch of green grass against a backdrop of mountains and palm trees", several movie stars from the 1940s were taught to fly cast at the pond, including Robert Taylor, Clark Gable, Jimmy Durante, and Barbara Stanwyck. In 1932, the fly fishing clubhouse adjacent to the fly fishing pond was used for the Summer Olympic Games and housed military personnel during World War II.

The Long Beach Greenbelt is a section of the old Pacific Electric right-of-way, restored by community activists as native habitat. It supports approximately 40 species of California native plants as well as a plethora of urban wildlife. Its pleasant, relaxing atmosphere provides for community open space while educating citizens about what the land was like prior to industrialization and urbanization.

Rancho Los Alamitos is a  historical site owned by the City of Long Beach and is near the Long Beach campus of the California State University system. The site includes five agricultural buildings, including a working blacksmith's shop,  of gardens, and an adobe ranch house dating from around 1800. The Rancho is within a gated community; visitors must pass through security gates to get to it.

Rancho Los Cerritos is a  historical site owned by Long Beach in the Bixby Knolls area near the Virginia Country Club. The adobe buildings date from the 1880s. The site also includes a California history research library.

Bembridge House, a Queen Anne Victorian house, is open for tours. Long Beach is also home to the nation's skinniest house.

The Earl Burns Miller Japanese Garden is on the campus of California State University, Long Beach.

Long Beach offers singing gondolier trips through the canals of Naples. Along with gondola rides on Lake Merritt, on the Napa River, in Huntington Beach, in Newport Beach, in Redondo Beach, and at The Venetian (Las Vegas), Long Beach is only one of seven places in the Western United States where tourists may ride in a gondola.

The front beach area of the city was once home to a now-defunct amusement park. Its first rollercoaster opened for business in June 1907. It was named the Figure 8 after the shape of the tracks, and was built on pilings that reached out over the water. In 1914 the Pike Amusement Zone undertook several upgrades and a new roller coaster named the Jack Rabbit Racer was opened in May 1915 becoming the second largest racing coaster in the country. It was part of the Silver Spray Pier which included several new rides and concessions. In the mid-twenties, several expansions were made to the area and the Jack Rabbit Racer was remodeled raising the ride's dips to a greater height and steepness but it was soon removed to make way for the Cyclone Racer roller coaster which opened May 1930. The new coaster was also built on pilings over the ocean, but as the breakwater was built and the harbor expanded, the sandy beach extended. Eventually the entire pier stood over the beach. When demolished in September 1968, the Cyclone Racer was the only two track roller coaster in the United States.

Rosie's Dog Beach in Belmont Shore is the only legal off-leash beach area for dogs on in Los Angeles County. The Dog Zone is in effect from 6 a.m. to 8 p.m. every day. This  area is situated between Roycroft and Argonne Avenues.

Sports

Grand Prix of Long Beach

The Grand Prix of Long Beach in April is the single largest event in Long Beach. It started in 1975 as a Formula 5000 race on the streets of downtown, and became a Formula One race, the United States Grand Prix West, the following year. From 1984 to 2008 it was a Champ Car event, and is now an IndyCar race. During the same weekend as the Grand Prix, there is also an IMSA SportsCar Championship race, a Formula D round and the Pirelli World Challenge.

The Long Beach Motorsports Walk of Fame is on South Pine Avenue in front of the Long Beach Convention Center adjacent to the Long Beach Grand Prix circuit. The Walk of Fame was created in 2006 to honor key contributors to motorsports and annually inducts new members in conjunction with the Long Beach Grand Prix. A  bronze medallion is placed in the sidewalk for each new inductee. The medallion includes a rendition of the racer's car and lists top achievements in motor sports.

Long Beach Marathon
The Long Beach Marathon is run every year in October throughout the City of Long Beach. The annual event includes a variety of races including a Kids Fun Run, a Bike Tour, 5K, Half Marathon and Full Marathon. All races begin and end around the Shoreline Village area of downtown Long Beach. 25,000 runners and cyclists participated in the 2013 festivities drawing nearly 50,000 people attending the event overall. The full marathon is a fast Boston qualifying course passing through sandy beaches, Belmont Shore, and the Cal State Long Beach campus.

Baseball
The Long Beach State 49ers baseball team has been playing since 1954. They play at Blair Field, across the street from Wilson High School. They are called the Dirtbags by many fans and is the team's official nickname.

Basketball
Long Beach was the home of the American Basketball League team Long Beach Chiefs during the 1962/1963 season. They played in the newly opened Long Beach Arena.

The minor league American Basketball Association team, the Long Beach Jam, played in the Walter Pyramid (a pyramid-shaped gym) on the Long Beach State campus) from 2003 to 2005.

The Southern California Summer Pro League is a showcase for current and prospective NBA basketball players, including recent draft picks, NBA players working on their skills and conditioning, and international professionals hoping to become NBA players. The league plays in the Pyramid-on the Long Beach State campus during July.

Sailing
Since its inception in August 1964, the Congressional Cup has grown into one of the major international sailing events. Now held in April, it is the only grade 1 match race regatta held in the United States. The one-on-one race format is the same as the America's Cup, and many of the winners of the Congressional Cup have gone on to win the America's Cup as well.

The Leeway Sailing and Aquatics Center on Alamitos Bay in Belmont Shore is a youth sailing program founded in 1929.

Water skiing
In July, there is the annual Catalina Ski Race, which starts from Long Beach Harbor and goes to Catalina Island and back to complete a  circuit. This race has been held annually since 1948 and features skiers from up to seventy teams from around the world.

Surfing

The breakwater reduces "mighty waves to mere lake-like lapping along the city's beaches". The fleet left in the 1990s, and now some residents are calling for it to be lowered or eliminated and the city has commissioned a $100,000 study for this purpose. In November 2019, the study concluded that any changes to the breakwater would be far too costly and could have potential impacts on the port of Long Beach, the port of Los Angeles, the oil islands, U.S. Naval Operations, Shoreline Marina, and the Peninsula.

Rugby union
The Belmont Shore rugby team plays in the US Rugby Super League. They have been in seven league finals, and have been champions three times.

College sports
Long Beach State's team mascot are the Beach. The school has participated in national championships in women's volleyball (5), men's volleyball (1), track and field (1), men's tennis (1; Division II), swimming (1; Division II), women's badminton (2), and women's field hockey (1). The school also has regularly appeared in NCAA tournaments in men's baseball, men's softball, men's basketball, women's basketball, men's golf, women's tennis, men's water polo, and women's water polo. Their cheer team were national champions in 2003, 2004 and 2006. The D1 roller hockey team were the 2011 national champions after defeating Lindenwood University.

The other collegiate sports team in the city is that of Long Beach City College. The school has appeared in national championships in men's gymnastics (6), football (5), women's soccer (3), and men's doubles and singles tennis (1 each). They have also had state championships in numerous sports, including 2006–7 championships in men's and women's water polo.

Archery
The archery field in El Dorado Regional Park was the site for the 1984 Los Angeles Olympics archery competition.

CSU Long Beach has one of the few remaining university varsity archery teams in California.

2028 Summer Olympics
Multiple sports will be held in Long Beach during the 2028 Summer Olympics, including BMX racing, water polo, triathlon, open water swimming, sailing and handball.

Government

Municipal

Long Beach is a California charter city, and is governed by nine City Council members, who are elected by district, and the Mayor, who is elected at-large since a citywide initiative passed in 1988. The City Attorney, City Auditor, and City Prosecutor are also elected positions. The city is supported by a budget of $2.3 billion, and has more than 5,500 employees. Long Beach was first incorporated in 1888 with 59 buildings and a new school. Nine years later, dissatisfaction with prohibition and high taxes led to an abortive and short-lived disincorporation. Before the year 1897 was out, the citizens voted to reincorporate, and the 1897 date of incorporation is shown on the city seal.

Long Beach is a full-service city that provides nearly all of its own municipal services, in contrast with a contract city. City hall provides a full range of traditional municipal services through the various departments that make up its staff of civil servants. In addition to its own police and fire departments, Long Beach provides:
Municipal water supply and sewer service through the Long Beach Water Department, which has a water treatment plant within the city and an extensive reclaimed water system for parks and other landscaping
A Gas & Oil Department, which manages consumer natural gas service and infrastructure, as well as crude oil extraction subsidence control
Health services through the Long Beach Health & Human Services Department, which handles both environmental health (such as restaurant/food inspection) and public health services. This is one of the only four municipal health departments in California (the other three being Berkeley, Pasadena, and Vernon)
Sanitation and recycling services through the Environmental Services Bureau in the Public Works Department
Animal control service that, in addition to serving Long Beach, serves nearby cities including Signal Hill and Seal Beach
A City Auditor
A City Prosecutor

Long Beach held its elections for City Council on April (primary) and June (runoff) until the 2018 election. Starting with the 2020 election, primary election is being held in March and runoff election is being held in November.

The major exception to the full range of municipal services is electricity, which is provided by Southern California Edison.

Federal and state representation

Politics
According to the California Secretary of State, as of October 19, 2020, Long Beach has 279,735 registered voters. Of those, 147,276 (52.65%) are registered Democrats, 47,615 (17.02%) are registered Republicans, and 66,857 (23.90%) have declined to state a political party/are independents.

Infrastructure

Police department

The Long Beach Police Department provides law enforcement for the City of Long Beach.

Restrictions on registered sex offenders
On March 18, 2008, Long Beach became the first city in California to heavily restrict residency and visitation rights for California registered sex offenders. Triggered by a local protest of a multi-apartment dwelling which tenanted several paroled registered sex offenders, and fueled by local radio hosts John Kobylt and Ken Chiampou of KFI's John and Ken show, city council members voted 7–0 to enact 18 ordinances, of which the most restrictive prohibits residency by all registered sex offenders, whether they are on parole or not, within  of any child care center, public or private school, or park. Google Maps measurements indicate the total exclusion area encompasses over 96% of the area of Long Beach that is zoned for residential use. Registered sex offenders residing within the exclusion zone were given until September 2008 to vacate the restricted area. Once this happens, no sex offender will legally be able to live in the vast majority of Long Beach. While several other ordinances restrict the number of registered sex offenders who may reside in an apartment complex, there are no apartment complexes within city limits that are outside of the exclusion zone. In addition, the ordinances prohibit all registered sex offenders from using any park, beach, or facility that caters to children, such as amusement parks and restaurants with children's playgrounds, or even travel within  of such places.

Fire department

The Long Beach Fire Department (LBFD), ISO Class 1, provides fire protection and emergency medical services to the City of Long Beach. The Long Beach Fire Department operates out of 23 Fire Stations throughout the city.

In addition to serving  with over 500,000 residents, the department's Marine Safety Division patrols the waterways and beach front areas.

Marine Safety Division
This includes the Port of Long Beach and Alamitos Bay. The division staffs 9 facilities year round, with an additional 41 stations during the summer Additionally the division has at its disposal 6 rescue boats, 7 beach patrols and a dive rescue unit. In 2012, lifeguards and other members of the marine safety division responded to 17,867 calls for service.

County

The Los Angeles Superior Court, which covers all of Los Angeles County, operates the Governor George Deukmejian Courthouse in downtown Long Beach. It is one of the 50 courthouses in the county.
The Los Angeles County Department of Health Services operates the Torrance Health Center in Harbor Gateway, Los Angeles, near Torrance and serving Long Beach.

State and federal

The Glenn M. Anderson Long Beach Federal Building in downtown Long Beach at 501 West Ocean Blvd., houses offices for NOAA and other federal agencies, although NOAA plans to shift leadership of the Fisheries office to the Pacific Northwest and shrink this office through attrition.
The Long Beach Main Post Office of the U.S. Postal Service serves as the main postal facility for Long Beach.
The Long Beach Naval Shipyard was established in 1943 and closed in 1997, employing over 16,000 people at its peak in 1945.

Education

Primary and secondary schools

Public schools
Long Beach Unified School District serves most of the City of Long Beach.

Other school districts that serve sections of Long Beach include:
 ABC Unified School District
 Paramount Unified School District
 Los Angeles Unified School District (LAUSD)

Private schools

Colleges and universities

Long Beach, California has two public institutions dedicated to higher education: California State University, Long Beach and Long Beach City College.

Founded in 1949, California State University, Long Beach is a comprehensive public university in the tree-filled Los Altos neighborhood. Long Beach State is three miles away from the Pacific Ocean and is known for their resources of the arts, such as the Carpenter Performing Arts Center.

Long Beach City College is a community college established in 1927. LBCC is composed of two separate campuses; the Liberal Arts Campus is on the residential area of Lakewood Village, while the Pacific Coast Campus is adjacent to the Eastside neighborhood.

Additionally, Pacific Coast University, a private non-profit law school, is located in Long Beach.

Transportation

Ports and freight

As of 2005, the Port of Long Beach was the second busiest seaport in the United States and the tenth busiest in the world, shipping some 66 million metric tons of cargo worth $95 billion in 2001. The port serves shipping between the United States and the Pacific Rim. The combined operations of the Port of Long Beach and the Port of Los Angeles are the busiest in the USA.

Rail shipping is provided by Union Pacific Railroad and BNSF Railway, which carry about half of the trans-shipments from the port. Long Beach has contributed to the Alameda Corridor project to increase the capacity of the rail lines, roads, and highways connecting the port to the Los Angeles rail hub.

Long Beach Cruise Terminal

Operated by Carnival Corporation, the Long Beach Cruise Terminal is the year-round home of three cruise ships carrying over 600,000 passengers annually. Passengers are processed in the domed structure that housed the Spruce Goose.

Catalina Landing
Catalina Express operates scheduled trips from the Catalina Landing.

Public transportation
Bus and coach services

Long Beach Transit provides local public transportation services within Long Beach, Lakewood, and Signal Hill. Long Beach Transit regularly operates 38 bus routes. Most regular service bus routes begin or end at the Long Beach Transit Mall in downtown Long Beach.

Long Beach Transit also operates the Passport shuttle within downtown Long Beach. During the summer, Long Beach Transit operates the AquaLink, a  catamaran that carries passengers between the downtown Long Beach waterfront and the Alamitos Bay Landing. In addition, during the summer, a 49-passenger water taxis called the AquaBus is provided. With $1 fares, the AquaBus serves six different locations within the downtown Long Beach waterfront.

Several transit operators offer services from the Long Beach Transit Mall. Torrance Transit offers bus service to the South Bay. The Los Angeles Department of Transportation (LADOT) offers bus service to San Pedro. LA Metro operates other regional bus lines. Orange County Transportation Authority offers limited bus service to Orange County. Route 1, from Long Beach to San Clemente is the longest bus route in the OCTA system. Traveling along Pacific Coast Highway for most of the route, it takes 2–2.5 hrs to complete.
Greyhound Lines operates the Long Beach Station in Long Beach. A FlyAway bus route to LAX began service on December 30, 2015. Buses to LAX leave 30 minutes past the hour every hour from 5:30 a.m. to 9:30 p.m.

Light rail

The Los Angeles County Metropolitan Transportation Authority (LA Metro) operates the Metro A Line, a light rail service that runs between the Downtown Long Beach Station (known as the Transit Mall Station until July 2013) and the 7th Street/Metro Center station in downtown Los Angeles. From the 7th Street/Metro Center Station, passengers can make connections to Hollywood, Union Station, Pasadena, East LA, Universal Studios, Chinatown, and other points of interest along the Los Angeles Metro Rail network. From Union Station in downtown L.A., transit users can access the regional Metrolink rail system to access a vast area of urban Southern California, and connect to nationwide Amtrak trains as well. The Metro A Line also offers connections to the Metro E Line at both the 7th Street/Metro Center Station and Pico Station with service to Santa Monica. In addition, at Willowbrook Station, passengers can transfer to the Metro C Line with service to Redondo Beach, Norwalk, and LAX via an additional shuttle connection. The Metro A Line Maintenance Shops are also in Long Beach just south of the Del Amo Blue Line station.

Historically, the city was served by Pacific Electric trains, including the Long Beach Line and several local streetcars.

Taxicabs
Taxicabs in Long Beach serve the tourism and convention industry and local services such as for elderly and disabled residents. Yellow Long Beach is the city's only licensed taxi franchise, with 199 taxicabs in service. Long Beach was the nation's first large city to relax restrictions on cabs by allowing them to offer variable, discounted fares, free rides and other price promotions to lure customers while keeping maximum fares in place. Many other cities have responded to Uber and Lyft by increasing regulation of these new competitors.

Airports

Long Beach Airport serves the Long Beach, South Bay and northern Orange County areas. It was also the site of a major Boeing (formerly Douglas, then McDonnell Douglas) aircraft production facility, which is the city's largest non-government employer. Los Angeles International Airport (LAX) is the nearest airport with international service. John Wayne Airport in Santa Ana is another alternative to the airport. However, its only international services are to Canada and Mexico. Other airports with scheduled service are Bob Hope Airport in Burbank and Ontario International Airport in Ontario.

Freeways and highways
Several freeways run through Long Beach, connecting it with the greater Los Angeles and Orange County areas. The San Diego Freeway (I-405) bisects the northern and southern portions of the city and takes commuters northwest or southeast to the Golden State/Santa Ana Freeways (I-5). The San Diego Freeway also provides regional access to Long Beach Airport, which is on the north side of the freeway near Signal Hill. The Long Beach Freeway (I-710) runs north–south on the city's western border, with its southern terminus adjacent to the Port of Long Beach on Terminal Island at the intersection of the Terminal Island Freeway (SR 103) and State Route 47. The Long Beach Freeway is the major spur route serving Long Beach from downtown Los Angeles, with its northern terminus near downtown Los Angeles in Alhambra. Along with the Harbor Freeway (I-110) to the west, the Long Beach Freeway is one of the major routes for trucks transporting goods from the Ports of Long Beach and Los Angeles to railyards and distribution centers in downtown Los Angeles and the Inland Empire. The southern end of the Long Beach Freeway joins Long Beach with Terminal Island via the Gerald Desmond Bridge.

Southeast Long Beach is served by the San Gabriel River Freeway (I-605), which joins the San Diego Freeway at the Long Beach/Los Alamitos border. The Artesia Freeway (SR 91) runs east–west near the northern border of Long Beach. The western portion of the Garden Grove Freeway (SR 22) provides a spur off of the San Diego and 605 Freeways to 7th Street in southeast Long Beach for access to the VA Long Beach Healthcare System, California State University, Long Beach, and Alamitos Bay.

Pacific Coast Highway (SR 1) takes an east to southwest route through the southern portion of Long Beach. Its intersection with Lakewood Boulevard (SR 19) and Los Coyotes Diagonal is the Los Alamitos Traffic Circle.

Bicycles and pedestrians
The city also has many Class 2 (painted lanes on roadway) and Class 3 paths (connecting bike routes with shared use of road with cars).

A 2019 study by Walk Score ranked Long Beach the tenth most walkable of over 100 cities around the world.

The  Shoreline Pedestrian Bikepath runs along the ocean from Shoreline Village to Belmont Shore. The southern terminus of the L.A. River bicycle path is in southwest Long Beach between downtown and the port. The southern terminus of the San Gabriel River bicycle path is just east of Long Beach in Seal Beach, and the trail runs north through the El Dorado Park neighborhood in east Long Beach and adjacent to El Dorado Regional Park.

The city's green lane project in Belmont Shore (sharrows, bike boxes) earned an award from the Institute of Transportation Engineers for best innovative project of the year (2010). In an effort to provide sustainable transportation alternatives to the community, as well as a safe route to several neighborhood schools, the city of Long Beach is also installing a "bike boulevard" on Vista Street, extending from Temple Avenue to Nieto Avenue.

Modal characteristics
According to the 2016 American Community Survey, 73.6 percent of working residents of Long Beach commuted by driving alone, 10.2 percent carpooled, 6.2 percent used public transportation, and 3.4 percent walked. About 2 percent commuted by all other means of transportation, including taxi, bicycle, and motorcycle. About 4.6 worked at home.

In 2015, 10.4 percent of city of Long Beach households were without a car, which decreased slightly to 10.0 percent in 2016. The national average was 8.7 percent in 2016. Long Beach averaged 1.69 cars per household in 2016, compared to a national average of 1.8 per household.

Media

Movies and television

Balboa Amusement Producing Company, also known as Balboa Studios, was at Sixth Street and Alamitos Avenue; they used  on Signal Hill for outdoor locations. Silent film stars who lived in Long Beach included Fatty Arbuckle and Theda Bara. The 1917 film Cleopatra, starring Theda Bara, was shot at the Dominguez Slough just west of Long Beach, and Moses parted the Red Sea for Cecil B. DeMille's 1923 version of The Ten Commandments on the flat seashore of Seal Beach, southeast of Long Beach. Long Beach was the famous location of Paramount newsreel footage of the 1933 Long Beach earthquake, out-takes from the W.C. Fields 1933 featurette International House was possibly the first earthquake to be captured in action on film.

Because of its proximity to LA-area studios and its variety of locations, today Long Beach is regularly used for movies, television shows, and advertisements. The city has filled in for locations across the nation and around the globe. One advantage for Long Beach is that the video and film industry uses a zone that extends  from Beverly Blvd. and La Cienega Blvd. in the West Hollywood area. It is cheaper to shoot within that zone, so Long Beach and other South Bay cities often stand in for areas of Orange County (such as for The O.C. TV show) because almost all of Orange County is outside of the zone.

One of the most famous Long Beach film locations is the home of Ferris Bueller in Ferris Bueller's Day Off. Though the film was set in the North Shore suburbs of Chicago the house is at 4160 Country Club Dr.

Long Beach Polytechnic High School has played host to numerous films, featuring its outdoor grounds in movies such as Coach Carter, among others. Robert A. Millikan High School has also lent its classrooms and hallways to films such as American Pie, among others. Juan Rodriguez Cabrillo High School has been a very popular place to shoot movies as well, with 2–4 films shot per year, and is being used to shoot 20th Century Fox's musical comedy-drama, Glee. St. Anthony High School's, Jack Errion Memorial Gymnasium has also been featured in a few movies and television shows, including Sunset Park, American Wedding, Coach Carter and Joan of Arcadia. Long Beach Woodrow Wilson High School was used to shoot Alvin and the Chipmunks: The Squeakquel and has been used for commercials for Nike and Adidas, particularly one with Los Angeles Sparks basketball star Candace Parker. The film Freedom Writers, although not shot there, was based on Long Beach Woodrow Wilson High School.

Other locations in Long Beach have been used frequently as well. An episode of The Lone Wolf, "The Long Beach Story", features the Wilton Hotel. Shoreline Drive visually approximates a freeway but is a municipal roadway and permits are accepted for its closure for shooting video and film – it has become a frequent movie and television freeway stand-in. Many car chase and crash scenes have been shot on stretches of road near the Long Beach harbor and along the city's Shoreline Drive. Among these are the 1963 movie It's a Mad, Mad, Mad, Mad World and numerous episodes of the 1970s TV drama CHiPs (as well as the 2017 film CHiPs). Long Beach's downtown neighborhood has stood in for various urban areas in a variety of movies. Gone in 60 Seconds (1974 film), Gone in 60 Seconds (2000 film), and Speed were shot in Long Beach. Transformers: Revenge of the Fallen was also shot in Long Beach as was Big Momma's House 2. CSI: Miami, Dexter, and Jane the Virgin, although set in Miami, Florida, regularly get shot in Long Beach. Much of Tenacious D: The Pick of Destiny was shot in Long Beach. Although there was a chase scene downtown, most of Tenacious D was shot at Alex's Bar at 2913 E. Anaheim St., a punk rock/alternative rock venue. Most of the viral hit Mega Shark Versus Giant Octopus was also shot by the Belmont Veterans Memorial Pier and Alamitos Energy Center in Long Beach.
The Long Beach Terrace Theatre has also been used for various commercials, an episode of Glee, as well as the film Last Action Hero. Several scenes from this David Spade comedy, Lost & Found, were shot around the Belmont Park area. The final scene from the Jim Carrey comedy remake Fun with Dick and Jane features Long Beach's scenic E. Ocean Blvd. route. La La Land features both a Long Beach apartment house and bar.

The Long Beach Naval Station and Naval Shipyard were featured in episodes of Visiting... with Huell Howser. The Pike and SoundWalk art show have also been featured.

Online
Long Beach has a number of online news outlets, including the Long Beach Post, Long Beach Local News,  The Modern Times of Long Beach, FORTHE, and LBReport.com.

Print
Long Beach's daily newspaper is the Long Beach Press-Telegram, which is distributed throughout most of the Gateway Cities and South Bay areas of southwest Los Angeles County. The Press-Telegram is owned by Digital First Media and is part of the Los Angeles Newspaper Group, which has several newspapers in the Southern California area which share resources and reporters.

On September 30, 1933, the Press-Telegram published what David Dayen called "One of the more influential letters to the editor in American history": Francis Townsend's letter outlining the Townsend Plan, a proposal that sparked a national campaign which influenced the establishment of the Roosevelt administration's Social Security system.

California State University, Long Beach also has a student newspaper published four times a week during the fall and spring semesters, the Daily Forty-Niner.

Long Beach also gets distribution of the daily Los Angeles Times and La Opinión newspapers, plus the weekly Los Angeles Sentinel.

The Gazette newspapers called The Grunion Gazette, The Downtown Gazette, and The Uptown Gazette are free, weekly newspapers that focus on various parts of the city. The Gazettes were sold to MediaNews (now Digital First Media), owner of the Press-Telegram, in 2004.

Palacio Magazine (formerly Palacio de Long Beach) is a free quarterly, bilingual magazine which runs stories focusing on community, education, art, health and wellness side by side in English and Spanish.

Although not based in Long Beach, the alternative weeklies OC Weekly and LA Weekly are distributed widely in Long Beach. Starting in 2007, Long Beach was served by its own The District Weekly, an alternative weekly that covered news, the arts, restaurants, and the local music scene. The District Weekly ceased publication in March 2010, citing lack of advertiser support.

In 2013 Freedom Communications, owner of the Orange County Register, launched a five-day daily newspaper, the Long Beach Register, aimed at competing with the Press-Telegram. In September 2014, the Long Beach Register was reduced to Sundays only, and was distributed as an insert in the Orange County Register. In August of the same year, just sixteen months after its much-publicized launch, Freedom Communications announced it would cease publication of the Long Beach Register completely, citing lack of reader and advertiser interest.

Radio
Long Beach is part of the Los Angeles DMA radio and television markets. Although a few radio stations have had studios in Long Beach over the years, including the 1980s alternative music and later hard rock station KNAC, the only remaining radio stations in Long Beach are the jazz and blues station KKJZ on the Cal State Long Beach campus, and the Christian radio broadcaster KFRN. The most recent radio station to grace the Long Beach airways is public radio station KLBP, 99.1, a low-power station, which started broadcasting in December 2018.

Notable people

Sister cities
Long Beach's sister cities are:
 Mombasa, Kenya
 Phnom Penh, Cambodia
 Qingdao, Shandong, China
 Sochi, Krasnodar Krai, Russia
 Yokkaichi, Mie, Japan
 Izmir, Turkey
 Kolkata, West Bengal, India

Friendship cities
Long Beach has friendly relations with:
 Bacolod, Negros Occidental, Philippines
 Rosarito Beach, Baja California, Mexico
 Venice, Veneto, Italy

See also
 1939 California tropical storm
 Lakewood Boulevard (State Route 19)
 Largest cities in Southern California
 List of City of Long Beach historic landmarks
 Long Beach Public Library
 Silverado Park, Long Beach, California
 List of U.S. cities with large Hispanic populations
 List of U.S. cities with large Cambodian-American populations
 USS Long Beach, 3 ships

References

Bibliography

External links

 

 
Incorporated cities and towns in California
Cities in Los Angeles County, California
Gateway Cities
Los Angeles Harbor Region
Populated coastal places in California
Port cities in California
Populated places established in 1880
1880 establishments in California
1897 establishments in California
Beaches of Los Angeles County, California
Beaches of Southern California